William W. Rockwell (July 21, 1824 –January 9, 1894) was an American politician from New York.

Life
Born in Hadley, Saratoga County, New York, he attended the common schools, and graduated from Bennington Academy.

He was Supervisor of the Town of Hadley in 1846 and 1847; and a member of the New York State Assembly (Saratoga Co., 2nd D.) in 1849. Afterwards he became a merchant in Glens Falls.

He was a member of the New York State Senate from 1878 to 1881, sitting in the 101st, 102nd (both 16th D.), 103rd and 104th New York State Legislatures (both 19th D.).

He died of heart disease in his home in Glens Falls at the age of 69, after two years of ill health.

References

Sources
 Civil List and Constitutional History of the Colony and State of New York compiled by Edgar Albert Werner (1884; pg. 291 and 355)
 The State Government for 1879 by Charles G. Shanks (Weed, Parsons & Co, Albany NY, 1879; pg. 59)
 History of Hadley, NY

1824 births
Republican Party New York (state) state senators
People from Hadley, New York
Politicians from Glens Falls, New York
New York (state) Whigs
19th-century American politicians
Town supervisors in New York (state)
Republican Party members of the New York State Assembly
1894 deaths